Leszek Sykulski (born 1981 in Częstochowa) is a Polish political scientist specializing in geopolitics.

Biography
He graduated from Jagiellonian University in Cracow (MA in history), Silesian University in Katowice (PhD in political science) and National Defence University in Warsaw (postgraduate studies). He graduated also from General Kosciuszko Military Academy of Land Forces (reserve officers' course).

Assistant professor in Department of National Security at the College of Business and Entrepreneurship in Ostrowiec Świętokrzyski. He was also a lecturer in National Defence University in Warsaw and Polonia University in Częstochowa. In 2015 was a visiting professor in Saint Jerome University in Douala (Cameroon).

He worked as an international security analyst in the Office of the President of Poland during presidency of Lech Kaczyński.

Sykulski is the founder of the pro-Russian Polish Geopolitical Society (in 2008–2009, 2012-2014 – president, now – honorary president), "Geopolitical Review" quarterly (in 2009-2016 – editor-in-chief) and far-right Geopolityka.net internet portal (editor-in-chief). He is also Editor of Polish "Ante Portas – Security Studies" and Bulgarian "Geopolitika".

Leszek Sykulski is a geopolitician and focuses his work on, amongst others, the representation of space in the information warfare and Russian and Polish geopolitical thought. He advocates for cooperation between Poland and Russia, as it would be in Poland's national interest. He is also engaged in research about the geopolitics of Central Europe.

Selected publications

 Polska myśl geopolityczna w latach 1989-2009 (Polish Geopolitical Thought 1989–2009), Chorzów 2015, .
 Studia nad rosyjską geopolityką (Studies on Russian Geopolitics), Częstochowa 2014, .
Geopolitics – Grounded in the Past, Geared Toward the Future, Częstochowa 2013, .
Geopolityka. Słownik terminologiczny (Geopolitics. Dictionary), Warszawa 2009, .

References

External links
 Leszek Sykulski – profile in Academia.edu 
 Leszek Sykulski - biography on the site of the Institute of Geopolitics in Poland.

Living people
Geopoliticians
1981 births
Polish political scientists